General elections were held in Nigeria on 28 and 29 March 2015, the fifth quadrennial election to be held since the end of military rule in 1999. Voters elected the President and members to the House of Representatives and the Senate. The incumbent president, Goodluck Jonathan, sought his second and final term.

The elections were first scheduled to be held on 14 February 2015. However, the electoral commission postponed it by six weeks to 28 March, mainly due to the poor distribution of Permanent Voter Cards, and also to curb ongoing Boko Haram insurgency in certain north-eastern states. The government closed its land and sea borders from midnight on 25 March until the end of the polling date. The election was extended to 29 March due to delays and technical problems with the biometric card readers.

It was the most expensive election ever to be held on the African continent. Nigeria is the continent's most populous country, has the largest economy and is its leading oil producer. Opposition candidate Muhammadu Buhari won the presidential election by more than 2.5 million votes. Incumbent President Goodluck Jonathan conceded defeat on 31 March, before the results from all 36 states had been announced. The election marked the first time an incumbent president had lost re-election in Nigeria. The President-elect was sworn in on 29 May 2015, marking the first time since Nigeria gained independence in 1960 that a sitting government peacefully transferred power to an elected member of the opposition. Buhari flipped many states that had voted PDP in the previous election.

Presidential election
Article 134 (2) of the Nigerian Constitution stipulates that a presidential candidate will be duly elected after attaining both the highest number of votes cast, and having received at least a quarter of the votes at each of at least two-thirds of the 36 states and the Federal Capital Territory (FCT). If no candidate satisfies the requirement, a second election will be held between the two leading candidates within seven days from the pronouncement of the result.

Party primaries

People's Democratic Party
It had long been assumed that incumbent President Goodluck Jonathan would run for re-election, as despite declining approval ratings, he was still thought to be popular and had several high-profile supporters. Jonathan officially confirmed his candidacy on 11 November at a rally in Abuja, announcing to cheering supporters:

Jonathan ran unopposed in the People's Democratic Party (PDP) primaries on 10 December 2014, receiving the nomination of the party. However, this was against an unwritten rule that the PDP's presidential candidacy should alternate between Muslim northerners and Christian southerners, and opposition to Jonathan's candidacy had led to the defection of dozens of PDP MPs in the House of Representatives.

All Progressives Congres
Prior to the elections, the All Progressives Congress was formed as an alliance of four opposition parties, the Action Congress of Nigeria, the Congress for Progressive Change, the All Nigeria Peoples Party, and the All Progressives Grand Alliance.

Its primaries, also held on 10 December, were won by retired Major General Muhammadu Buhari, who defeated Kano State Governor Rabiu Kwankwaso, former Vice-President Atiku Abubakar, Imo State Governor Rochas Okorocha and newspaper editor Sam Nda-Isaiah.
On 17 December, APC chose Professor Yemi Osinbajo as the running mate of General M. Buhari.

As of February 2015, "Though the APC's voter base is in the north, it enjoys support all over the country, unlike the opposition in 2011."

Presidential Debate
A presidential and Vice presidential Debate was conducted by the Nigerian media with majority of the candidates attending.
The debate was attended by the then incumbent president Goodluck Jonathan, and his vice Namadi Sambo, while as predicted, the Presidential candidate of the All Progressives Congress, Muhammadu Buhari boycotted the debate while his vice presidential nominee attended. 
The debate which lasted for approximately an hour was watched by over 20 million people in Nigeria, with radios and the Internet conveying through other means.

Candidates
Fourteen candidates contested the election.

The main opposition Goodluck Jonathan faced was from Muhammadu Buhari of the APC. While inaugurating a 250-bed Orthopaedic Hospital in Wamakko, Buhari said: "We will stop corruption and make the ordinary people, the weak and the vulnerable our top priority".

Conduct
After a botched governor's election in Anambra State, there were serious concerns that the election would not go smoothly. The country's election commission had promised a better election process, hoping that combating electoral fraud would prevent the violence that had plagued previous Nigerian elections. Despite this, a pre-election poll by Gallup noted that only 13% of Nigerians had confidence in the honesty of elections.

The Socialist Party of Nigeria filed for registration as a political party to contest the election, but the Independent National Electoral Commission (INEC) refused the registration. The SPN sued the INEC at the Federal High Court, claiming that INEC had failed to respond to their petition within 30 days as prescribed by law and that thus it would have to be registered automatically.

The presidential election was a trending topic in Nigeria on Twitter, one social media platform reflecting public opinion; although PDP/GEJ may simply have had better support on social media, which is not representative of the population as a whole. According to Impact Social, based on data from 40,000 tweets, Facebook messages, blogs, and other internet outlets that mention PDP or GEJ, 70% of public opinion toward President Jonathan is positive, but messaging on the economy has taken up 6% of election conversation and was seen as a key PDP strength. Social media support for Buhari/APC was a bit "noisier" without a single issue leveraged by the campaign to gain traction: there was general frustration that the campaign lacked consistency, content and focus on the important issues at hand. Social media also played a vital role in serving as a watchdog for the integrity of the election process, as results from polling stations were quickly posted, thus preventing electoral officials from announcing different results from the ones already publicised online.

In January 2015, the #bringbackourgirls campaign raised alarm over plans by the Independent National Electoral Commission (INEC) to exclude Chibok and some communities currently under the control of the Boko Haram from getting the permanent voter cards (PVCs) for the February elections. Jonathan's already controversial handling of the situation was exacerbated by the Twitter campaign that was launched in mid 2014, #BringBackJonathan2015, which was widely considered to be insensitive to the victims and their families. Jonathan eventually called for banners containing the hashtag to be taken down and asked for the hashtag to not be used.

Postponement 
On 8 February 2015, the Independent National Electoral Commission announced that "presidential and national assembly elections will now hold on 28 March while the governorship and state assemblies election will take place on 11 April," mainly due to the poor distribution of Permanent Voter Cards, and also the security concerns related to the Boko Haram insurgency in certain north eastern states.

The postponement was called on the grounds of the INEC failing to deliver Permanent Voters' Cards to millions (around 34%) of voters – reportedly only around 45.1mn of 68.8mn registered voters had received PVC's. Additionally, on 5 February, the National Council of State (chaired by President Jonathan) told INEC that it had just launched a major, decisive offensive against Boko Haram for six weeks. Due to the assets and resources that would go into this offensive, the military would be unable to provide security and logistics support for elections. This is a disputable claim, since election security is the primary responsibility of not the military (which should only act as support) but the police and civil defence corps. There is speculation over whether or not the postponement was motivated by politics rather than security and has raised questions over the political neutrality of the military as well as the independence of INEC.

 Sambo Dasuki, Nigerian national security advisor, told the commission "that operations against Boko Haram militants meant the military "will be unable to provide adequate security" for the 14 February vote." "Seventeen out of the 28 registered political parties" supported postponing the elections; 12 opposed, "including the leading opposition party, All Progressives Congress". By 30 January, "Boko Haram was in total occupation/complete control of 13 local governments (and other swathes of land) in Borno and 2 each in Yobe and Adamawa." Critics of the postponement view it as a political move on behalf of GEJ/PDP rather than one made in the interest of national security. GEJ/PDP are losing traction due to gains by Boko Haram in January, economic strains from the slide in global oil price (Nigeria's key export), and GEJ/PDP's slow progress on fighting corruption and improving infrastructure. According to primaries in December 2014, Buhari/APC is viewed as more equipped to fight insecurity and corruption.

Critics have pointed out that even with the postponement, the Nigerian government is unlikely to re-establish control in all the affected areas by the date of the election. Distribution of the Permanent Voters' Card (PVC) has begun in camps for internally displaced persons (IDPs) from the three affected states. Estimates of the number of IDPs range from 868,235 to 1.5 million people, and is not yet clear how successful efforts will be to organise elections under these circumstances. Key Government officials in Nigeria are publicly stating their opposition to the postponement. Senator Chris Ngige, for example, has accused the PDP of pressuring INEC to postpone the general elections.

In addition to growing criticism within Nigeria, on 8 February Vanguard reported that "the United States said it was 'deeply disappointed' by the delay." US Secretary of State John Kerry, who had urged that elections be held on time, "[warned] the Nigerian government against using 'security concerns as a pretext for impeding the democratic process.'" Additionally, the British Foreign Secretary, Philip Hammond, has revealed that he, too, is disgruntled by the news: "The security situation should not be used as a reason to deny the Nigerian people from exercising their democratic rights. It is vital that the elections are kept on track and held as soon as possible". Deutsche Welle reported that "The postponement has been seen by critics as a ploy by President Goodluck Jonathan and the ruling People's Democratic Party (PDP) to buy time to sway support from the popular main opposition candidate and former military dictator, Muhammadu Buhari."

By 7 February 2015, threats of post-election violence from both sides remained a concern, given that hundreds of people died in the rioting that followed the 2011 Nigerian presidential election, and rhetoric was running high. It was reported that "the Council of Imams and Ulamas in Kaduna State ... told the Niger Delta militants threatening chaos if President Goodluck Jonathan loses the presidential election that they stand to lose if there is a war." The GMB Volunteers, a group described as a "frontline voluntary organization made up of professionals, ethnic and religious groups," has criticised hate advertisements directed against APC candidate General Muhammadu Buhari.

On 9 February, although "Nigerian civil society" was "in uproar" over the postponement, the north east remained calm, and voters there appeared willing to wait.

Groups such as the Nigeria Stability and Reconciliation Programme (NSRP) have "advised political parties to stop making hate speeches against opponents."

The Nigeria Women Platform for Peaceful Election (NWPPE) is collaborating with United Nations Women to hold training sessions for journalists on gender-based violence and gender sensitive reporting. A "women situation room", similar to a "civil society situation room" is planned for monitoring violence against women during the elections.

Senator Abubakar Bukola Saraki, who has called the postponement "an obstruction of democracy", nonetheless released a statement saying "I charge Nigerians to be calm, non-violent and steadfast. We must be determined to make sure postponement does not demoralize or disenfranchise us. We must see this as a challenge for us to remain resolute in yearning for a new democratic government; one that will not see itself as above the people."

On 31 January, a concert was held in Owerri, Imo State, as part of the RSVP concert series, urging young people to RSVP – Register, Select, Vote and Protect. "Register – pick your Permanent Voters' card-PVC, Select (select your candidates), and Vote – vote not Fight, and Protect – protect your mandate." A second RSVP concert was planned for Lagos on 8 February.

The postponement was the topic of a Council on Foreign Relations online conference call with John Campbell on 28 February 2015.

According to the Nigerian Constitution, the presidential election must be held by 28 April. As Section 25 of the 2010 Electoral Act states, the date is to be no later than 30 days before the expiration of the previous office holder's term of office.

Media support
Buhari was supported by The Economist "with a heavy heart" as "the least awful" option; the newspaper was scathing about the repression and economic policy of Buhari's previous regime, but praised his subsequent adherence to democratic process, anti-corruption stance, and the legitimacy he held in the Muslim North as a stronger platform with which to combat Boko Haram.

Voting day
The website of the Independent National Electoral Commission was hacked on election day by a group calling itself the Nigerian Cyber Army.

Extension
Voting was extended due to technical problems with electronic card readers. The technology was introduced to prevent voter fraud, but was opposed by President Goodluck Jonathan who called it a "huge national embarrassment" when problems caused a delay. President Jonathan himself failed to be accredited by the card reader, which was shown live on national television.

Violence
Boko Haram attempted to disrupt the election by attacking voting centres, killing 41 people. An opposition politician, Umaru Ali, was gunned down in one attack.

Peace initiatives 
The Jos Forum Inter-communal Dialogue Process was established to serve as a sustainable and impartial dialogue mechanism to be used by the communities to handle disputes. In 2015, the Jos Peace Dialogue Forum has already served as a platform for various political parties to discuss challenges and commit to peaceful elections in 2015.

President Buhari said that the election was not a do-or-die affair.

Observers
Election observer missions [EOM] were deployed from the African Union (AU), Commonwealth of Nations, Economic Community of West African States (ECOWAS) and the European Union (EU); and were led by Amos Sawyer, Bakili Muluzi, John Kufuor, and Santiago Fisas respectively.

UN Secretary-General Ban Ki-moon congratulated the citizens and the government for conducting a peaceful and orderly election. The AUEOM concluded that the elections were conducted in a "peaceful atmosphere" and met the "continental and regional principles of democratic elections". ECOWAS EOM said that it met the "criteria of being free and transparent" despite "pockets of incidents and logistical challenges." The Commonwealth EOM described the conduct as "generally peaceful and transparent."

Opinion polls

Results

President

By state

Senate

House of Representatives

References

 
Presidential elections in Nigeria
Parliamentary elections in Nigeria
Nigeria
2015 elections in Nigeria
Election and referendum articles with incomplete results
March 2015 events in Nigeria